Peter Risi (16 May 1950 – 11 December 2010) was a Swiss footballer who played at both professional and international levels as a striker.

Career
Born in Buochs, Risi played club football for FC Winterthur, FC Zürich and FC Luzern, and was top scorer of the Nationalliga A in 1976, 1979, and 1981.

Risi also earned fifteen caps for Switzerland between 1974 and 1977.

Later life and death
Risi died on 11 December 2010 following an illness.

References

1950 births
2010 deaths
Swiss men's footballers
Switzerland international footballers
Association football forwards
FC Zürich players
FC Luzern players
FC Winterthur players